Walter Henry "Polly" Koch (August 1, 1895June 22, 1976) was a player in the American Professional Football Association for the Rock Island Independents in 1920 as a guard and tackle. He played at the collegiate level at the University of Wisconsin–Madison.

References

1895 births
1962 deaths
Sportspeople from Fond du Lac, Wisconsin
Players of American football from Wisconsin
American football offensive guards
American football offensive tackles
Wisconsin Badgers football players
Rock Island Independents players